Roberto Duailibi (born October 8, 1935, in Campo Grande, Brazil), is a Lebanese-Brazilian advertising executive originally from Zahlé.

Biography 

After graduating with a degree in advertising from Escola de Propaganda de São Paulo in 1956, Roberto Duailibi became a publicist. He began his career in advertising in 1952 at the Colgate-Palmolive company. In 1956, he worked as a copywriter for advertising agencies such as Companhia de Incremento de Negócios (originally called CIN, now Leo Burnett Publicidade Ltda), JWT, McCann Ericson, and Standard Propaganda, where he was the Creative Vice-President.

In 1968, he joined José Zaragoza, Francesc Petit, and Ronald Persichetti to create DPZ, one of Brazil's largest and most award-winning advertising agencies. He was awarded the "Advertiser of the Year" in 1969 by Prêmio Colunistas.

Roberto Duailibi is a writer and professor in addition to his recognition as an advertising executive. He was a professor and course director at ESPM in São Paulo before becoming the dean of the Institution Council. He was also a Creative Professor at the ECA -- which is the Escola de Comunicações e Artes of USP - Universidade de São Paulo.

He was chairman of ABAP, the Brazilian Association of Advertising Agencies. He is an advisor of Fundação Bienal de São Paulo, Fundo Social de Solidariedade of the São Paulo State Government, and Chairman at FUNCEB - Fundação Cultural Exército Brasileiro.

He wrote several books, including Criatividade & Marketing, with Harry Simonsen Jr.. This book shows the concept of the heuristic ruler and the importance of following methods to encourage creativity across a company's departments. In addition to Criatividade & Marketing, he successfully published his quote collections, initially called Phrase Book. In 2005, he published 'Cartas a um Jovem Publicitário', directed toward young advertising professionals. In 2008, he published the collection Idéias Poderosas with Marina Pechlivanis, gathering thematic selections of quotations in a pocketbook. In the same year, he also launched the new edition of Criatividade & Marketing with a digital version of the Heuristic Ruler.

Bibliography 
2008 Criatividade & Marketing, Roberto Duailibi & Harry Simonsen Jr. Editora M Books. 
2008 Idéias Poderosas - Felicidade, Roberto Duailibi e Marina Pechlivanis. Editora Elsevier 
2008 Idéias Poderosas - Inteligência, Roberto Duailibi e Marina Pechlivanis. Editora Elsevier 
2008 Idéias Poderosas - Negócios, Roberto Duailibi e Marina Pechlivanis, Editora Elsevier 
2005 Cartas a um jovem publicitário. Editora Campus 
2005, Editora Campus 
2000 Duailibi das Citações. Editora Arx

References 

DUAILIBI, Roberto. Cartas a um jovem publicitário. Editora Campus, São Paulo, 2005. 
DUAILIBI, Roberto & SIMONSEN JÚNIOR, Harry. Criatividade: a formulação de alternativas em marketing. São Paulo, Abril S/A, McGraw-Hill, 1971. 
MCCARTHY, E. Jerome. Marketing. Rio de Janeiro, Campus, 1982. 
BREZZO, R & COBRA, M. New Marketing. São Paulo, 2009. 
KIRKPATRICK, Jerry. In defense of Advertising. Claremont, CA, 1997.

External links 
 Website of the advertising agency with its history and icons of the Brazilian advertising
Website of Faculdade Cásper Líbero with data on the Brazilian advertising history 
Interview to CPDOC/FGV
Interview to a Brazilian University - PUC 
Interview to an advertising website
Brazil-Arab News Agency

1935 births
Brazilian advertising executives
Living people